Thuraya AlArrayed:() is an Arabic language Saudi poet and writer she was born in 1948, and received a bachelor's degree from the College of Beirut, in 1966, and then an MBA from American University of Beirut in 1969 and PhD from the University of North Carolina, United States General in 1975.

About her life
Worked in several areas, including the Ministry of Education in Bahrain between 1967 and 1969 and joined the Saudi Arabian Oil Company (Aramco) is the largest oil company in the world year in 1980 and ceased to day and works as a consultant for planning.

Dr. Thuraya Al Arrayed is a well-known Arab thought leader and journalist whose regular columns tackling current and controversial issues are read by a broad readership of Saudi and Arabic newspapers. She is also a frequent guest on both Arab and international radio and television programs dealing with cultural, social, educational and literary issues. She participates in a proliferation of national, regional and international forums and conferences regarding issues of importance to the Arab world. An active advisor to NGO�s in Saudi Arabia and the Arab region, she works in Saudi Aramco as a planning advisor. She is member of the Research and Advisory Group Saudi Aramco Affairs, and the Advisory Team of the Arab Thought Foundation as well as several other influential organizations. The recipient of numerous scholastic and academic awards, Ms. Arrayed received her BA from BCW Beirut College for Women, MA in Educational Administration from AUB the American University of Beirut and PhD in Ed. Planning and Administration from UNC University of North Carolina at Chapel Hill. She lives in Dhahran, Saudi Arabia.

Work and education
Education
University of North Carolina at Chapel Hill
PhD, Ed planning and Admin, 1975
American University of Beirut
MA, ED Admin, 1969
Bahrain Highschool for girls 1966

Professional Summary
Phd in Educational planning and administration from UNC Chapel Hill.
Writer and poet
Daily columnist in alWatan News Paper
Planning consultant
Advisory board member of Prince Sultan Fund for small business for women
Member of IPRA Gulf Chapter
Member of Advisory Board of Arab Thought Foundation
President of Saudi Society for Information and Communication. Eastern Province branch
Member of Saudi Human Rights Society

References

1948 births
Living people